Eric Dolphy at the Five Spot, Vols. 1 and 2, is a pair of jazz albums documenting one night (16 July 1961) from the end of Eric Dolphy and Booker Little's two-week residency at the Five Spot in New York. This was the only night to be recorded. The engineer was Rudy Van Gelder.

A third volume from this session was released, titled Memorial Album, containing "Number Eight (Potsa Lotsa)" and "Booker's Waltz". These two tracks were later released on the Rudy Van Gelder remaster of Volume 2.

All three volumes were reissued, without alternate takes, as a triple LP under the title The Great Concert of Eric Dolphy. Two other tracks, Mal Waldron's "Status Seeking" and Dolphy's solo rendition of Billie Holiday's "God Bless The Child", were released on the Dolphy compilation Here and There. Dolphy and Little were backed by a rhythm section consisting of pianist Mal Waldron, bassist Richard Davis, and drummer Eddie Blackwell.

Dolphy's composition "The Prophet" is a tribute to the artist Richard "Prophet" Jennings, who had designed the covers of Dolphy's earlier albums, Outward Bound and Out There.

Reception
In an AllMusic review of volume 1, Michael G. Nastos stated that Dolphy's group had "developed into a role model for all progressive jazz combos to come", while "[t]he combined power of Dolphy and Little -- exploring overt but in retrospect not excessive dissonance and atonality -- made them a target for critics but admired among the burgeoning progressive post-bop scene." Nastos continued: "With the always stunning shadings of pianist Mal Waldron, the classical-cum-daring bass playing of Richard Davis, and the colorful drumming of alchemistic Ed Blackwell, there was no stopping this group." He concluded: "Most hail this first volume, and a second companion album from the same sessions, as music that changed the jazz world as much as Ornette Coleman and John Coltrane's innovative excursions of the same era. All forward thinking and challenged listeners need to own these epic club dates."

Scott Yanow, reviewing volume 2, called the album "[a]n excellent set that records what may have been Dolphy's finest group ever, as well as one of that era's best working bands." A review in PDX Jazz called the Five Spot recordings "a tremendous live set" and "a very spirited performance with surprisingly good sound quality given its recording in a mere club back in the early 1960s." Stuart Nicholson, writing for Jazzwise, included the Five Spot tracks in his list of "five essential albums" by Dolphy, and wrote: "Eric Dolphy liked plenty of solo space to express himself, and this live date at New York's Five Spot... gave him precisely that. His fiercely vocalised alto solo on 'Fire Waltz' is the stuff of legend, for many his most memorable, diverging from the linear logic and techniques of variation employed by most post-war jazz musicians."

Dolphy biographers Vladimir Simosko and Barry Tepperman observed that the Five Spot recordings "present the rare opportunity to study a night's work in the club," and stated: "despite any unevenness in strength of solos or tightness of the performances, a very well-balanced and brilliant group is in evidence... the unity and wide dimensions revealed by the preservation of one night's work remain to testify to the quintet's worth and vitality."

Setlist
"Status Seeking"
"God Bless the Child"
"Aggression"
"Like Someone in Love"
"Fire Waltz"
"Bee Vamp" (two takes)
"The Prophet"
"Number Eight (Potsa Lotsa)"
"Booker's Waltz"

Track listing

Volume one
"Fire Waltz" (Waldron) – 13:44
"Bee Vamp" (Little) – 12:30
"The Prophet" (Dolphy) – 21:22
"Bee Vamp" (Alternate Take) – 9:27
(Track 4 not on original LP.)

Volume two
"Aggression" (Little) – 17:21
"Like Someone in Love" (Jimmy Van Heusen) – 19:58
"Number Eight (Potsa Lotsa)" (Dolphy) – 15:33
"Booker's Waltz" (Little) – 14:39
(Tracks 3-4 not on original LP.)

Memorial Album
"Number Eight (Potsa Lotsa)" (Dolphy) - 15:33
"Booker's Waltz" (Little) - 14:39

Personnel
Eric Dolphy — alto saxophone, bass clarinet and flute
Booker Little — trumpet
Mal Waldron — piano
Richard Davis — double bass
Ed Blackwell — drums

Sources
Richard Cook & Brian Morton. The Penguin Guide to Jazz on CD 6th edition.

References

1961 live albums
1964 live albums
Eric Dolphy live albums
New Jazz Records live albums
Live post-bop albums
Live avant-garde jazz albums
Original Jazz Classics live albums
Albums produced by Esmond Edwards
Albums recorded at the Five Spot Café